Brand of Cowardice is a 1925 American silent Western film directed by John P. McCarthy and starring Bruce Gordon, Carmelita Geraghty and Harry Lonsdale.

Cast
 Bruce Gordon as Michael Cochrane aka Smith
 Carmelita Geraghty as Don Alvarado's Daughter
 Harry Lonsdale as Don Luis Alvarado
 Cuyler Supplee
 Ligia de Golconda
 Charles McHugh as Ranch Hand
 Mark Fenton 
 Sidney De Gray

References

External links
 

1925 films
1925 Western (genre) films
American black-and-white films
Films directed by John P. McCarthy
Silent American Western (genre) films
1920s English-language films
1920s American films